The Half of It is a 2020 American coming-of-age comedy-drama film written and directed by Alice Wu. It stars Leah Lewis, Daniel Diemer, and Alexxis Lemire, with Enrique Murciano, Wolfgang Novogratz, Catherine Curtin, Becky Ann Baker, and Collin Chou in supporting roles. Teenager Ellie Chu agrees to write a love letter for a jock while falling for his crush. Netflix released the film on May 1, 2020, to positive reviews. The film received the Founders Award for Best Narrative Feature at the 2020 Tribeca Film Festival.

The film is a modern loose retelling of the 1897 play Cyrano de Bergerac in which teenage Ellie Chu begins writing love letters on behalf of the inarticulate Paul Munsky to his crush, Aster Flores.

Plot

Friendless student Ellie Chu lives in the remote town of Squahamish, where she makes extra money writing homework papers for her fellow students. She lives with her widower father and performs most of his duties as station master and signalman. She is approached by Paul Munsky, an inarticulate football player, to write a love letter to Aster Flores, a girl at their school. Ellie initially refuses, but accepts the work after learning that her home's electricity will be shut off if they fail to make a minimum payment. Aster is dating Trig, a boy from a wealthy family, and Ellie begins a heartfelt correspondence with Aster through letters and text messages. The two connect over their shared interests in literature and art, though Aster believes she is communicating with Paul. Ellie's English teacher encourages her to apply to Grinnell College, but Ellie plans to stay in Squahamish, despite being unhappy there, because she does not want to leave her father.

Ellie sets up Paul on a date with Aster, but it goes badly because Paul is unable to converse with her like Ellie can. Ellie regards this as the end of their attempts, but after Paul defends her from bullies, she agrees to teach him about art and literature. Ellie and Paul begin to bond as they open up about their family struggles. Paul's second date with Aster goes as badly as the first, but Ellie saves the evening by texting Aster while pretending to be Paul. Paul abruptly confesses his romantic interest in Aster and later tells Ellie that he kissed her. Paul brings Ellie to a party and takes her to his home after she becomes intoxicated, where he sees letters in her bag addressed to food critics, presumably about his sausage creations.

Aster invites Ellie to spend the day together. She takes her to a hidden hot spring where they swim and share an intimate conversation. Aster reveals that Trig intends to marry her, while Ellie reveals that she does not believe in God and talks about her deceased mother. Meanwhile, at Ellie's house, Paul and her father bond as they make sausages. Later, Ellie watches from her window as Paul and Aster kiss, and she decides to apply to Grinnell. After a game, mistakenly believing that she loves him, and having developed feelings for her, Paul attempts to kiss Ellie, but she rejects him. Aster sees them and walks away angrily. Paul realizes that Ellie loves Aster and, due to his religious upbringing, tells Ellie that it is a sin. When Paul delivers sausage to Ellie's father, Ellie's father and Paul have a conversation about love wherein Ellie's father asks Paul if he has ever loved someone so much, that he did not want to change anything about them. Trig proposes to Aster at a church service, but Ellie and Paul publicly interrupt the moment by sharing the true meaning of "love" using Ellie's wording from a previous letter. Aster realizes that Ellie wrote the letters and text messages pretending to be Paul; she slaps Paul and storms out.

Before leaving for Grinnell, Ellie apologizes to Aster for deceiving her. Aster admits that she may have had feelings for Ellie and that she is applying to art school. Ellie kisses Aster and tells her that she will see her in a couple of years. Paul sees Ellie off at the train platform and tells her that his sausages have received good reviews, and that he will keep visiting her father. As in Ek Villain, the film they watched together, Paul runs beside the train as it leaves. Ellie laughs at his silliness, then observes the passengers around her as she goes off to start a new journey in her life.

Cast
 Leah Lewis as Ellie Chu, a shy, introverted, Chinese-American straight-A student
 Daniel Diemer as Paul Munsky, a school jock whom Ellie helps out by writing love letters
 Alexxis Lemire as Aster Flores, the daughter of a local deacon
 Collin Chou as Edwin Chu, Ellie's father
 Wolfgang Novogratz as Trig Carson, Aster's boyfriend
 Becky Ann Baker as Mrs. Geselschap
 Catherine Curtin as Colleen Munsky, Paul's mother
 Enrique Murciano as Deacon Flores, Aster's father

Production
In April 2019, it was announced Leah Lewis, Alexxis Lemire, Daniel Diemer, Becky Ann Baker, Catherine Curtin, Wolfgang Novogratz, and Enrique Murciano had joined the cast of the film, with Alice Wu directing from a screenplay she wrote. Wu and Anthony Bregman served as producers on the film, with Netflix distributing. In June 2019, it was announced that Collin Chou joined the cast.

Filming
Principal photography began on April 22, 2019, in New York and concluded on May 31, 2019.

Release
It was scheduled to have its world premiere at the Tribeca Film Festival on April 18, 2020. However, the festival was postponed due to the COVID-19 pandemic. It was released on May 1, 2020.

Critical response
The website's critical consensus reads, "For viewers in search of an uncommonly smart, tender, and funny coming-of-age story, The Half of It has everything." On Metacritic, the film has a weighted average score of 75 out of 100 based on 20 critics, indicating "generally favorable reviews".

Decider said the plot is  "an unbearably cute premise—a modern-day Cyrano de Bergerac with a queer twist—that seems so perfect and so obvious, it’s a wonder the movie hasn’t been made yet", and "an adorable teen film that will no doubt service an extremely underserved audience." Rolling Stone praised the direction, stating that "the gentle touch Wu uses as a filmmaker, which only occasionally drifts into tidiness, does not dull the edges of her quietly revolutionary achievement in telling the story of a young lesbian immigrant’s journey to self-acceptance. In a movie brimming over with the pleasures of the unexpected, that’s the best part." The New York Times noted that "Wu suffuses the film with a painfully mature understanding of the ache of longing for the impossible."

Bitch magazine wrote that "while these teenage-focused...movies flirt with the idea of lesbian relationships, they quickly pivot before their casual interest can evolve into any fully realized romance", with the film's story seeming "to be more about the halfway happiness Ellie's given: maybe some acceptance, maybe a friend, maybe a first love. It's not the happy story we were sold via the trailer, and it feels like more promises that only halfway delivered."

Leah Lewis (the actress who portrayed Ellie Chu) told Teen Vogue in an interview on 1 May 2020 that: "Most people think a love story has an equation, and that's usually boy meets girl, girl meets boy, or girl meets girl." However, in this case "[i]t's a self-love story because these characters don't really end up with each other, but at the very end, they end up with something. For me, that's even more valuable than just finding your other half; it's finding a part of yourself along the way. It is a love story, it's just not a 'romance' story."

In a post dated May 22, 2020, A.O. Scott recommended it as his top film of 2020 so far. Similarly, Educating Georgia's film expert Steph called it their film of 2020 in their retrospective of the year.

Accolades
The film received the top award at the 2020 Tribeca Film Festival, the Founders Award for Best Narrative Feature. It was also nominated for the 2021 GLAAD Media Award for Outstanding Film (Limited Release).

References

External links
 
 

2020 films
2020 comedy-drama films
2020 independent films
2020 LGBT-related films
2020s American films
2020s coming-of-age comedy-drama films
2020s English-language films
2020s high school films
American coming-of-age comedy-drama films
American high school films
American teen comedy-drama films
American teen LGBT-related films
English-language Netflix original films
LGBT-related films about Chinese Americans
Films about interracial romance
Films based on Cyrano de Bergerac (play)
Films scored by Anton Sanko
Films shot in New York (state)
Lesbian-related films
LGBT-related comedy-drama films
LGBT-related coming-of-age films